Navendu Prabhat Mishra (born 22 August 1989) is a British 
Labour Party politician who has served as the Member of Parliament (MP) for Stockport since 2019.

Early life
He is of Indian ancestry; his mother is from Gorakhpur and his father is from Kanpur, both in Uttar Pradesh. He attended the public school Clifton College in Bristol.

Career
Before entering politics, Mishra was a shop-floor trade unionist in Stockport, eventually becoming an organiser for Unison and helping to organise care workers in precarious employment. 

Mishra was one of the founders of Stockport Momentum and supported Jeremy Corbyn in the 2015 and 2016 Labour leadership elections.

He was a member of the Labour Party National Executive Committee from September 2018 until December 2019. As he was one of the nine representatives for Constituency Labour Parties, Mishra was ineligible to remain a member of the NEC upon his election as a Member of Parliament.

Mishra unsuccessfully contested the seat of Hazel Grove (part of the Metropolitan Borough of Stockport) in the snap election of 2017, but achieved Labour's highest vote share ever in that constituency. He won 20.5% of the vote in a seat that has traditionally been a Conservative-Liberal Democrat marginal.

He was selected as Labour's candidate for Stockport in the 2019 general election after the incumbent, Ann Coffey, left the Labour Party in protest over Jeremy Corbyn's leadership and joined Change UK. Mishra held the seat for Labour, with a 52% share of the vote.

Mishra is a member of the Socialist Campaign Group and endorsed fellow SCG member Rebecca Long-Bailey in the 2020 Labour leadership election.

On 15 October 2020, Mishra resigned as PPS to Angela Rayner to vote against the proposed Covert Human Intelligence Sources (Criminal Conduct) Bill, rebelling against the Labour whip to abstain.

During the 2021 Batley and Spen by-election, Mishra accused his own party of having a "hierarchy of racism", with "some groups seen as fair game for attacks based on religion/race/heritage".

Personal life
Mishra lives in Brinnington.

References

External links

Living people
People educated at Clifton College
UK MPs 2019–present
Year of birth missing (living people)
British politicians of Indian descent
Labour Party (UK) MPs for English constituencies
Members of the Parliament of the United Kingdom for Stockport
People from Stockport
1989 births